Mitchison may refer to:

Avrion Mitchison FRS (born 1928), British zoologist and immunologist
Denis Mitchison CMG (1919–2018), British bacteriologist
Gilbert Mitchison, Baron Mitchison CBE QC, known as Dick Mitchison (1894–1970), British Labour politician
Graeme Mitchison (1944–2018), a Cambridge mathematician and scientist
Murdoch Mitchison FRS, FRSE (1922–2011), British zoologist, the son of the Labour politician Dick Mitchison
Naomi Mitchison (1897–1999), Scottish novelist and poet
Rosalind Mitchison (1919–2002), historian of Scotland who specialised in social history
Tim Mitchison, PhD, FRS is a British systems biologist

Patronymic surnames
English-language surnames
Surnames of English origin
Surnames of British Isles origin